The National Human Rights Committee (NHRC) is a government-appointed human rights commission based in the State of Qatar. Established in 2002, it has been tasked with the responsibility of overseeing and carrying out investigations on human rights abuses in the country.

Organization
As of 2015, Ali bin Samikh Al Marri is the chairman of the commission and Dr. Mohamed Saif Al Kuwari is vice-chairman. Fourteen members serve in the committee. The members are government-appointed and consist of civil servants and government ministers.

History
The National Human Rights Committee was founded in 2002 by virtue of law no. 38. The law stipulated that it would be headquartered in the capital city of Doha and would be independently financed. All governmental agencies were ordered to procure their full cooperation with the commission. The NHRC was re-organized by the government in 2010 to reinforce its independence, and in the same year, the International Coordinating Committee of National Human Rights Institutions upgraded the commission's classification to Category A, the highest classification for international human rights institutions.

The NHRC signed a memorandum of understanding with the US-based human rights organization Solidarity Center in 2009. In November 2010, the NHRC's new building in Fereej Abdel Aziz was opened by Prime Minister Hamad bin Jassim bin Jaber Al Thani.

The NHRC  is classified as A by the International Coordinating Committee (ICC), which hosts all the national human rights commissions in the world. The National Human Rights Committee is a member of the ICC Subcommittee on Accrediting and Compiling National Committees in the World The National Human Rights Committees (Asia Pacific Forum) since March 2012 for 3 years.

Qatar diplomatic crisis 

Since the beginning of the Qatari diplomatic crisis in 2017, NHRC has held dozens of workshops, conferences and seminars with organizations and politicians worldwide. NHRC's activities aimed to reveal the crisis violations of human rights as well as discussing the general situation of human rights in Qatar.

In September 2017, NHRC Chairman Dr Ali bin Sumaikh Al Marri underlined the urgent need to put an end to the suffering of the Qatari citizens and residents of Qatar as a result of the siege imposed on Qatar since June 2017. During a meeting with U.S official, Al Marri introduced the impact of the siege on the humanitarian status of the civilians in Qatar, as he called on United States to take serious action in order to put an end to the human rights violation caused by Saudi-led blockade.

According to the NHRC, the crisis affected the education of 190 Qatari students enrolled in Egyptian universities because of  the government's imposition of new visa requirements.Some of the students were prevented from attending final exams in September 2017. As a response NHRC escalated the issue to several international organisations.

Mission 
The commission's aims revolve around raising awareness of human rights abuses, monitoring and observing human rights abuses, and empowering individuals. Their means of advancing this goal include contributing to research programs related to human rights, conducting studies and providing advice and recommendations to legislative bodies. The NHRC also advocates for the rights of individuals with disabilities.

Strategic goals 
The need to improve the human rights situation comes through strategic plans and programs. so the NHRC put some strategic goals to be followed. First, Raising awareness and education on human rights for different groups and groups. Second, Providing protection, assistance and empowerment to victims and victims of violations. Third, International and regional cooperation in the field of human rights. Fourth, building Institutional capacity. Fifth, develop national legislation. sixth, Education of human rights. Finally, Promotion and development of human rights.

References

External links
Official website

Organizations established in 2002
2002 establishments in Qatar
Human rights organisations based in Qatar